"Hate Me Now" is the second and final single by rapper Nas featuring Sean Combs (performing as Puff Daddy), from Nas' third studio album I Am.... The backbeat is inspired by, and contains some samples from, Carl Orff's "Carmina Burana". It was ranked 119 on XXL's 250 Best Songs of the 1990s.

Production and release
In a 2007 interview with Rolling Stone, Nas recalled the making of the song: "It was a track D-Moet produced for Foxy Brown, and she didn't want the record, she didn't like it. It fit with my album, I Am..., so I did the D-Moet track and it sounded perfect for Puff to be on, so I gave it to him, went to the studio, and he rocked it, knocked it out."

"Hate Me Now" was released as a single in the U.S. by Columbia Records on April 6, 1999.

Composition
Biographer Ronin Ro describes Combs's persona in "Hate Me Now" as "the angry young rapper battling jealous critics," a theme that would influence Combs's 1999 album Forever. The beat samples "Carmina Burana" by Carl Orff.

Critical reception
For RapReviews.com, Steve Juon said that "Hate Me Now" was the "only truly overpowering song" from I Am...: "It may be yet another mad track about playa hating, but the rebuttal of the hate is crisp and well defined - owing little to cliche." In 2013, Complex ranked the "Hate Me Now" video no. 8 in its "50 Best Rap Videos of the '90s" list.

Music video
The music video for the single, directed by Hype Williams and featuring Nas being crucified, was the subject of extreme controversy, as the original edit also featured Sean Combs, then known as Puff Daddy, on the cross. Puffy, who was a Catholic, had demanded that his crucifixion scene be excised from the broadcast edit of the video. However, the wrong edit was incorrectly sent to MTV, which broadcast that version on the April 15, 1999, edition of TRL. Within minutes of the broadcast, Combs had barged into the offices of Nas' manager Steve Stoute with several bodyguards, and struck Stoute over the head with a champagne bottle. In June 1999, Stoute sued Combs, resulting in a $500,000 out-of-court settlement from Combs.

Charts

Weekly charts

Year-end charts

Use in media
The song was used as the entrance song for Nate Diaz at finale of the 5th season of The Ultimate Fighter
The song was used as the entrance song for former UFC Heavyweight Champion Frank Mir at UFC 81 and UFC 92.
The song was used as the entrance song for Marcus Aurelio at UFC 102.
The song is the entrance music for Colorado Rockies pitcher Huston Street.
Dave East, who has multiple collaborations with Nas, titled his 2015 mixtape 'Hate Me Now'. Nas is featured on the track "Forbes List".
Hate Me Now is also sampled by the mashup artist Girl Talk on his track "Hold Up" from his 2006 album Night Ripper.
This song is also a playable track in the rap karaoke video game "Def Jam Rapstar".
Song was used as the opening intro music alongside an orchestra for the 2009-2010 Toronto Raptors home opener.
Eminem freestyled to the song when on the Tim Westwood Show.
The song was used during a promo package for professional wrestler The Miz at WrestleMania XXVII.
Ace Hood freestyled to the song on Hot 97's Funkmaster Flex Freestyle Pt. 2.
The song was used in Skam Season 3 Episode 6 "Escobar Season".
The song was used in the soundtrack for football video game Madden NFL 10
The song was used in the soundtrack for basketball video game NBA 2K14
The song was used in a musical production in Episode 9 of Dear White People (TV series)

References

External links

1998 songs
1999 singles
Music videos directed by Hype Williams
Music video controversies
Nas songs
Sean Combs songs
Song recordings produced by Trackmasters
Songs written by Nas